Wang Qun is the name of:

Wang Qun (politician) (1926–2017), Chinese politician who served as Communist Party Secretary of Inner Mongolia
 Wang Qun (actor) (1960–2008), Chinese actor
 Wang Qun (swimmer) (born 1991), Chinese swimmer
 Wang Qun (Go player) (王群)